Jiangning Road is a station on the Shanghai Metro, which services Line 13 and opened on December 19, 2015. Travelling eastward, this station is the last station in Putuo District before it passes under the Suzhou Creek to Jing'an District.

Exits 
Jiangning Road station serves the south eastern part of Putuo District and is located below the intersection of Jiangning Road and Changshou Road. There are currently 4 entry points.

References

Railway stations in Shanghai
Line 13, Shanghai Metro
Shanghai Metro stations in Putuo District
Railway stations in China opened in 2015